Kaalia is a 1997 Indian Hindi-language action film directed by T. L. V. Prasad, starring Mithun Chakraborty, Dipti Bhatnagar, Sheeba, Kiran Kumar, Johnny Lever, Raza Murad and Mukesh Rishi. The movie was a failure at box office.

Plot 
Kaalia  is an action flick from the Mithun-T. L. V. Prasad team. The film has the usual story line of revenge and the fight against injustice. Kalicharan lives a middle-class life with his unmarried sister. Since Kalicharan is an honest man, he refuses to pay or accept bribes, which brings him into the bad books of gangster Bhawani Singh. When Kalicharan refuses to budge, Singh gets Kalicharan arrested on false charges and he is sent to prison. In prison, a new Kalicharan is born — who calls himself Kaalia — and whose main motive is the destruction of Bhawani Singh.

Cast 
Mithun Chakraborty as Kalicharan 'Kaalia'
Dipti Bhatnagar as Priya (Kaalia's wife)
Sheeba as Inspector
Kiran Kumar
Johnny Lever as Khaan Sahab/Dada
Ram Mohan as Police Commissioner
Mukesh Rishi as Pratap Singh
Raza Murad
Paintal (comedian) as Nandlal Choubey
Rami Reddy (actor)
Tej Sapru as Police Inspector
Monicka
Kangna Ranuat (actress) as Jyoti

Soundtrack

References

External links 
 

1997 films
1990s Hindi-language films
Mithun's Dream Factory films
Films shot in Ooty
Films scored by Anand Raj Anand
Films directed by T. L. V. Prasad
Indian action films